Arthur Greville Collins (September 5, 1896 - September 1, 1980) was a British-born film director.

Career
Collins was born in London, and began directing for the stage, including productions of Fata Morgana, No Man's Land, and Tarnish.

In 1921, he married actress Betty Ross Clarke and accompanied her in her theatrical career in Great Britain, the United States, and Australia. In 1934 he wed Rhoda Shepherd.

He moved to Los Angeles and directed some plays there, then moved into movie making as a dialogue director for Warner Bros. He worked in that capacity for two years then became a director, making several B pictures.

He moved to Australia in May 1939 to make Seven Little Australians (1939) and decided to stay there. He served in the RAAF during World War II, being discharged as a squadron leader. He also was stationed as administrative officer for two years at Port Pirie and Mount Gambier.

In 1947 Collins managed to source funding to make another movie, Strong Is the Seed (1949). He later announced plans to make a film about Cobb and Co but this did not eventuate. In 1950, Collins travelled to New Zealand where he produced the musical comedy Chu Chin Chow for the Christchurch Operatic Society to favourable reviews.

Partial filmography
They Can't Be Snookered (1932 short) – producer
The Widow from Monte Carlo (1935) – director
Personal Maid's Secret (1935) – director
Nobody's Fool (1936) – director
Thank You, Jeeves! (1936) – director
Paradise Isle (1937) – director
Shots and Shots (1937 short) – co-director
 Saleslady (1938) – director
Seven Little Australians (1939) – director
Strong Is the Seed (1949) – director
Port of Escape (1960) – producer, incomplete

References

External links

Arthur Greville Collins at National Film and Sound Archive

1890s births
1980 deaths
American film directors